The Battalion for the Defence of the Language (Hebrew: גדוד מגיני השפה, pronounced gdud meginey hasafa) was a small but militant body established by Jewish students at the Herzliya Hebrew Gymnasium in Tel Aviv, Israel in the 1920s to urge Jews to use only the Hebrew language.

The group campaigned against the use of other languages under the slogan עברי, דבר עברית ivri daber ivrit "Hebrew [i.e. Jew], speak Hebrew!" Its most prominent supporters were  Mordechai Ben-Hillel Hacohen, a Hebrew writer, Zionist and one of the founders of Tel Aviv, and Zvi Yehuda Kook, the son of the chief rabbi Abraham Isaac Kook.

The Jewish (mostly Yiddish) press tended to portray the group as "a gang of fanatic, insolent hoodlums". Indeed, the battalion was sometimes involved in violence. For example, it "used to tear down signs written in ‘foreign’ languages and disturb Yiddish theatre gatherings". However, the battalion acted largely "as patriotic watchdog, barking loudly and baring its teeth but seldom actually biting."

On 15 August 1929, the Jewish fast of Tisha B'Av, 300 youths led by Jeremiah Halpern, who were mostly from the Battalion with some from Betar and other youth movements, made political speeches, raised the Zionist flag and sang the Zionist anthem at the Wall. A counter-demonstration by Muslims on the following day was followed by violent incidents and subsequently led to the 1929 Palestine riots and especially the destruction of the Jewish community in Hebron.

The Battalion's focus on language forms rather than patterns
According to Ghil'ad Zuckermann, the Battalion members attacked "Yiddish forms rather than patterns in the speech of the Israelis who did choose to speak 'Hebrew'". For example, the Battalion "would not attack an Israeli speaker uttering the Israeli expression מה נשמע má nishmà, which literally means 'what's heard?' but which actually means 'what's up?'" The reason is that the forms within this expression (namely the words ma "what" and nishma "heard") are indeed Hebrew. However, according to Zuckermann, the pattern of this expression (the fact that the combination of "what" and "heard" means "what's up") is European: The expression is a calque, a loan translation, of the Yiddish phrase  , usually pronounced vsértsəkh and literally meaning "what's heard?" but actually "what's up?" At the same time, the Israeli expression  מה נשמע má nishmà also replicates the following European phrases, all of them also meaning literally "what's heard?" but actually "what's up?": Russian  , Polish , Romanian  and Georgian  .

Zuckermann argues that even the Hebrew anthem of the Battalion for the Defence of the Language included a calque from the very language that the Battalion despised: Yiddish. The sentence ועל כל מתנגדינו אנחנו מצפצפים veál kol mitnagdénu anákhnu metsaftsefím, which appears in the Battalion anthem, means literally "and on all our opponents we are whistling". The actual meaning of this sentence is "We don't give a damn about our opponents; we defy our opponents". "Whistling" is a calque of the Yiddish word  , which means both "whistle" and "not give a damn".

See also
Pro-Wailing Wall Committee
Western Wall
1929 Palestine riots
Association for Palestinian Products

Notes

References
Frank, Mitch (2005). Understanding the Holy Land: Answering Questions About the Israeli-Palestinian Conflict. Viking. 
Meyers, Nechemia (2002). Yiddish Lives - A Language That Refuses to Die. The World and I, February 1.
Segev, Tom (2000). One Palestine Complete: Jews and Arabs Under the British Mandate. Abacus. 
Segev, Tom (2009). When Tel Aviv was a wilderness. Haaretz, 10 May.

Jewish organizations in Mandatory Palestine
Non-governmental organizations involved in the Israeli–Palestinian conflict
History of Palestine (region)
Zionism